Fengjia Town is an urban town in and subdivision of Xinhua County, Hunan Province, People's Republic of China.

Administrative division
The town is divided into 29 villages and one community:
Qinren Community
Xiangbei Village
Baisha Village
Hongtian Village
Shuanglin Village
Zhuhu Village
Xuanxi Village
Shikeng Village
Yueguang Village
Baomu Village
Chaping Village
Chuan'ao Village
Daqiao Village
Maoping Village
Ganzi Village
Pingshang Village
Pingxia Village
Guanwang Village
Xujia Village
Hengjiang Village
Hengnan Village
Maojia Village
Henglaping Village
Shangtuan Village
Xiatuan Village
Maoxi Village
Moxijiang Village
Zhaiyuan Village
Yanban Village

References

External links

Divisions of Xinhua County